Ants in the Mouth is a 2005 Spanish-Cuban thriller film directed by Mariano Barroso consisting of an adaptation of the novel Amanecer con hormigas en la boca by Miguel Barroso. It stars Eduard Fernández, Ariadna Gil, Jorge Perugorría and José Luis Gómez.

Plot 
The fiction is set in the late 1950s. Released from jail after spending 8 years in a Francoist prison, Martín moves to pre-revolutionary Havana, Cuba, looking for his girlfriend Julia, and once there, he is told by Julia's uncle Dalmau that she is dead. He eventually finds out that she had married Freddy Navarro, a corrupt senator of the Batista regime.

Cast

Production 
A Spanish-Cuban co-production, the film was produced by Drive Cine, Messidor Films and ICAIC with participation of TVE and Canal+. Boasting a budget of around €4 million, the film was shot in 2004 in locations of Cuba (including Havana) and Spain.

Release 
Ants in the Mouth premiered as the opening film of the 8th Málaga Film Festival in April 2005. Distributed by Filmax, the film was theatrically released in Spain on 29 April 2005.

Reception 
Jonathan Holland of Variety deemed the film to be "a brooding, intense and shrewdly-plotted thriller set in 1950s Havana", featuring a "beautifully modulated" lead performance by Fernández, although, conversely, the reviewer assessed that Gil fails to turn "her femme fatale beauty into anything deeper".

Accolades 

|-
| align = "center" rowspan = "2" | 2005 || rowspan = "2" | 8th Málaga Film Festival || colspan = "2" | Special Jury Prize ||  || rowspan = "2" | 
|-
| Silver Biznaga for Best Actor || Eduard Fernández || 
|-
| align = "center" rowspan = "2" | 2006 || CEC Medals || Best Adapted Screenplay || Mariano Barroso, Antonio Hernández, Tom Abrams ||  || align = "center" | 
|-
| 20th Goya Awards || Best Costume Design || Sonia Grande ||  || align = "center" | 
|}

See also 
 List of Spanish films of 2005

References 

2005 thriller films
Films set in Havana
Films set in the 1950s
Films shot in Cuba
Films shot in Spain
Cuban thriller films
Spanish thriller films
2000s Spanish-language films
2000s Spanish films
Spanish neo-noir films